Yoshito Okuda (31 July 1870 - 21 August 1917) was the mayor of Tokyo from June 15, 1915, until his death on August 21, 1917.

Footnotes

Mayors of Tokyo
1917 deaths
1870 births